Nuthampstead is a small village and civil parish in North East Hertfordshire located a few miles south of the town of Royston. In the 2001 census the parish had 139 residents, increasing to 142 at the 2011 Census.

Nuthampstead was historically a hamlet in the parish of Barkway. The hamlet appointed its own overseer of the poor, and as such became an separate civil parish on 10 August 1866 under the Poor Law Amendment Act 1866. Despite becoming a separate civil parish, it remains part of the ecclesiastical parish of Barkway. Nuthampstead was included in the Royston Poor Law Union from 1835. It formed part of the Ashwell Rural District from 1894 until 1935, when that district was absorbed into the Hitchin Rural District. Since 1974, Nuthampstead has been part of North Hertfordshire. Due to its small size, Nuthampstead has a parish meeting rather than a parish council.

During the Second World War, RAF Nuthampstead, situated next to the village, was home initially to the 55th Fighter Group and subsequently the 398th Bombardment Group of the U.S. Army Air Forces.  This latter unit, the base's primary occupant, flew Boeing B-17 Flying Fortress heavy bombers on missions over occupied Europe.

Known as USAAF Station 131 during the war, and less formally as AAF Nuthampstead, the airfield was constructed by U.S. Army engineer battalions starting in 1942. The site was formerly Scales Park, which was planted with oak trees after the Battle of Trafalgar.  These were cleared to make room for the runways, hangars, and other wartime facilities.  Visitors to the site will find that the main runways have since been removed, with a grass runway and service roads only remaining to allow the airfield to be used by light aircraft.

In 1968–71 the Commission on the Third London Airport (the "Roskill Commission") considered Nuthampstead as one of its four short-listed sites, along with Cublington, Foulness (later known as Maplin Sands) and Thurleigh.

Barkway VOR is located at Nuthampstead Airfield.

Areas of the former airfield have been converted into a shooting ground. Since 1992, when planning permission was granted, the ground has developed to enable it to hold major championships in four international shooting disciplines.

The village has a pub/restaurant with bed and breakfast facilities, called The Woodman. Outside The Woodman is a large memorial stone dedicated to the 398th squadron.

See also
 The Hundred Parishes

References

External links
 http://www.controltowers.co.uk/N/Nuthampstead.htm

Villages in Hertfordshire
Civil parishes in Hertfordshire